Aditya Kalyanpur (born 21 July 1978) is an Indian Tabla Maestro. He belongs to the Punjab gharana.

Early life and background
Aditya Kalyanpur was born in Mumbai, India.

He began his studies at the age of five under the guidance of Tabla Maestro late Alla Rakha Khan and his son Zakir Hussain.

He is a commerce graduate from Mithibai College.

Performing career
Aditya Kalyanpur was initially known for his debut performance with his guru Zakir Hussain for the Wah Taj! commercial when he was 11 years old.

His style consists of bold and clear execution of syllables, pinpoint precision in rhythm coupled with a colossal repertoire of compositions and improvisational technique.

He has accompanied artists including Shivkumar Sharma, Amjad Ali Khan, Prabha Atre, N. Rajam, Sultan Khan, Shahid Parvez, Vishwa Mohan Bhatt, Satish Vyas, Shujaat Khan, and Nayan Ghosh. He has also accompanied Carnatic performers including T. N. Krishnan, N. Ramani, U. Shrinivas, and Lalgudi Krishnan.
Kalyanput went on tour with A.R. Rahman for his JAI HO World Tour! He can be heard on Katy Perry's "Legendary Lovers" from her album "Prism," has recorded with Keith Richards of The Rolling Stones.

Awards
"TOP" Grade Artist of All India Radio
'Taal – Mani' by Sur Singar Samiti
Vidyasagar Award, ITC
Sangeet Visharad
National Scholarship for Advanced Training, Government of India
Awardee of Pandit Jasraj Competition, Vedic Heritage Center, Long Island, New York

Performances
Orient Arts Festival, Estonia
Edinburgh festival, Scotland (2003)
Earagal Arts Festival, Ireland
Jazz Yatra, Mumbai
Great Lakes Folk Festival, Lansing, Michigan
Saptak Festival

References

External links
Official Site
MySpace
Facebook Page
Instagram Account
Twitter Account
YouTube Account
New England School of Music

1978 births
Hindustani instrumentalists
Living people
Musicians from Mumbai
Tabla players
21st-century drummers
Male drummers
21st-century male musicians